Stephen Sachs (born August 14, 1959) is an American stage director and playwright. He is the co-artistic director of the Fountain Theatre in Los Angeles, which he co-founded in 1990.

Biography
Sachs was born in San Francisco and grew up in Los Angeles. He graduated from Los Angeles City College Theatre Academy in 1980 and worked as an actor in film, TV, and theater. He made his debut as a professional stage director in 1987 with an adaptation of The Baron in the Trees at the Ensemble Studio Theatre, to positive reviews. Sachs co-founded the Fountain Theatre in 1990 with Deborah Lawlor. He has led the venue as artistic director since its founding and has directed and written numerous productions. He is married to actress Jacqueline Schultz; they have two children.

The Fountain Theatre
The Fountain Theatre has won hundreds of awards for all areas of production, performance, and design. In 2020, it was honored with the Margaret Harford Award for sustained excellence in theater, presented by the Los Angeles Drama Critics Circle. In a 2021 end-of-year retrospective, Los Angeles Times theater critic Charles McNulty called the Fountain "L.A.'s most enterprising intimate theater [that] continues to punch far above its weight… No L.A. theater has done a better job of asking us to reexamine our lives through the lens of acute contemporary drama this year than the Fountain."

Athol Fugard
Sachs was chosen by South African playwright Athol Fugard as one of the few directors in the United States to premiere his new plays. The collaboration goes back to when Sachs directed the Los Angeles premiere of Fugard's The Road to Mecca, in 2000.

In 2004, Sachs was selected to direct the world premiere of a new Fugard play, titled Exits and Entrances, which won a number of awards. Sachs went on to direct regional productions of the play around the country and overseas.

In 2008, Sachs directed the Fugard play Victory. The production was named "Critic's Choice" and "Best of 2008" in the Los Angeles Times.

Deaf-themed theater and film
Sachs was instrumental in launching and supporting the Deaf West Theatre Company at the Fountain Theatre in 1991. The company won a Tony Award for its acclaimed ASL version of Big River on Broadway in 2003. His play about deafness and cochlear implants, Sweet Nothing in My Ear, was made into a television movie starring Jeff Daniels and Marlee Matlin and presented on the Hallmark Hall of Fame on April 20, 2008. The teleplay was written by Sachs, and the film was directed by Joseph Sargent.

Sachs' play about deafness and language, Open Window, had its world premiere at the Pasadena Playhouse in 2005, winning the California Governor's Media Access Award for Theater Excellence.

His deaf spin on Cyrano debuted at the Fountain Theatre in 2012, starring Troy Kotsur. His 2018 deaf-themed play Arrival & Departure starred Kotsur and his wife, actress Deanne Bray.

Productions

as director
 The Road to Mecca (2000) Los Angeles premiere
 After the Fall (2002) Los Angeles
 Exits and Entrances (2004) world premiere, Los Angeles
 Hippolytos (2006) Getty Villa, Malibu, world premiere translation
 String of Pearls (2006) Los Angeles premiere
 Exits and Entrances (2007) off-Broadway, NYC
 Miss Julie: Freedom Summer (2007) world premiere, Los Angeles
 Gilgamesh (2007) world premiere adaptation
 Victory (2008) United States premiere
 Shining City (2009) Los Angeles premiere
 Coming Home (2009) West Coast premiere
 Side Man (2010) starring Christine Lahti, LA Theatre Works

as playwright
 The Baron in the Trees (1987), adaptation
 The Golden Gate (1991)
 Sweet Nothing in My Ear (1997)
 Mother's Day (1999)
 Central Avenue (2001)
 Open Window (2005), Pasadena Playhouse
 Gilgamesh (2007), adaptation
 Miss Julie: Freedom Summer (2007), new version of August Strindberg's Miss Julie
 Bakersfield Mist (2012)

Awards and recognition

As playwright and director, Sachs has won every theater award in Los Angeles. He has been nominated for the SDC Zelda Fichandler Award three times, recognizing an outstanding director who makes a unique and exceptional contribution to theater in their region. He was honored by the Los Angeles City Council for "his visionary contributions to the cultural life of Los Angeles".

as director
 Best Director – Golden Gate – Drama-Logue Award (1990)
 Best Director – Fanon's People – Drama-Logue Award (1991)
 Best Director – Cuckoo's Nest – Drama-Logue Award (1992)
 Best Director – The Seagull – Drama-Logue Award (1993)
 Best Director – Night Mother – Drama-Logue Award (1994)
 Best Director – Ashes – Drama-Logue Award (1994)
 Best Director – Lonely Planet – Robby Award nomination (1996)
 Best Director – The Road to Mecca – Maddy Award (2000)
 Best Director – The Road to Mecca – Robby Award nomination (2000)
 Best Director – After the Fall – Maddy Award (2002)
 Best Director – After the Fall – Ovation Award (2002)
 Best Director – Sweet Nothing in my Ear – Minneapolis (2003)
 Best Director – Exits and Entrances – Ovation Award, Los Angeles (2004)
 Best Director – Exits and Entrances – Los Angeles Drama Critics Circle Award (2004)
 Best Director – Exits and Entrances – L.A. Weekly Award nomination (2004)
 Best Director – Exits and Entrances – Maddy Award, Los Angeles (2004)
 Best Director – Exits and Entrances – Carbonell Award nomination (2005)
 Best Director – Victory – NAACP Theatre Award (2008)
 2009 Zelda Fichandler Award nomination (2009)
 Best Director – Coming Home – LA Weekly Award (2009)

as playwright
 Best Playwright – Golden Gate – Drama-Logue Award (1990)
 Citation of Appreciation, Los Angeles City Council, for "enhancing the cultural life of the City of Los Angeles" (1996)
 California Governor's Media Access Award for Theatre – Sweet Nothing in my Ear (1997)
 Finalist – Sweet Nothing in my Ear – PEN West Literary Award for Drama (1998)
 Best Play – Mother's Day – Garland Award Honorable Mention (1999)
 Finalist – Central Avenue – PEN West Literary Award for Drama (2001)
 Best Play – Central Avenue – Back Stage Garland Award (2001)
 Best Play – Central Avenue – Beverly Press Maddy Award (2001)
 Best Adaptation – Miss Julie – Los Angeles Drama Critics Circle nomination (2007)
 Best Adaptation – Miss Julie – L.A. Weekly Theatre Award nomination (2007)

References

External links

 

American theatre directors
1959 births
Living people
People from San Francisco
American dramatists and playwrights